Jaltenco is the municipality located in Zumpango Region, a small municipality on this region, covers an area of  4.7 km², this territory is in the northeastern part of the state of Mexico in Mexico. The municipal seat is San Andrés Jaltenco, although both are commonly called only San Andrés. The municipality is located at a northern pass leading out of the Valley of Mexico to 60 kilometers north of Mexico City and about 200 km northeast of the state capital of Toluca.

As of 2005, the municipality had a total population of 26,359.

Geography
The location of the municipality is north of the Mexico City, and is located in the low extreme geographical coordinates of Greenwich, north latitude 19º45'23" minimum, 19º46'28" maximum, west longitude 99°05'30" minimum, 99°06'35" maximum.

The town of San Andrés Jaltenco, a municipal seat, has governing jurisdiction over the following to Arboledas Jaltenco. The total municipality extends 4,7 km and borders with the municipalities of Zumpango and Nextlalpan. The area of this municipality is 15 km² (59.85 sq mi).

Flora and fauna 
90% of Jaltenco municipality is urbanized; all territory is plane lands, live here small mammals as mouse, rabbit, bat and gopher, birds as sparrow. The flora is century plants, prickly pears, chollas and others.

References

Municipalities of the State of Mexico
Populated places in the State of Mexico
Nahua settlements